Timberlane is a census-designated place (CDP) in Jefferson Parish, Louisiana, United States. The population was 10,364 in 2020. It is part of the New Orleans–Metairie–Kenner metropolitan statistical area.

Geography
Timberlane is located at  (29.880140, -90.029523).

Demographics

The 2019 American Community Survey estimated 9,950 people lived in the CDP, down from 10,243 at the 2010 U.S. census. At the 2020 U.S. census, the population rebounded to 10,364. In 2019, the racial and ethnic makeup was 37.4% non-Hispanic white, 40.9% Black or African American, 0.1% Native American, 7.2% Asian, 4.5% some other race, 3.5% two or more races, and 10.6% Hispanic and Latino American of any race. By 2020, its racial and ethnic makeup was a tabulated 37.51% non-Hispanic white, 35.23% Black or African American, 0.15% Native American, 7.38% Asian, 5.6% two or more races, and 14.13% Hispanic and Latino American of any race. The median household income was $54,702 and 8.6% lived at or below the poverty line in 2019.

Education
Residents are assigned to schools in the Jefferson Parish Public Schools system.

Schools that serve Timberlane for elementary school are Cox and Solis. Schools that serve Timberlane for middle school are Gretna Middle and Livaudais. Portions of Timberlane are within the zones of Helen Cox High School and West Jefferson High School. In regards to advanced studies academies, residents are zoned to the Gretna Academy.

References

Census-designated places in Louisiana
Census-designated places in Jefferson Parish, Louisiana
Census-designated places in New Orleans metropolitan area